Charitoprepes is a genus of moths of the family Crambidae. It is placed in the species-rich tribe Margaroniini in the subfamily Spilomelinae. 

The genus currently contains three species:

C. lubricosa Warren, 1896, the type species of the genus; it is known from the Indian Khasi Hills, Korea, Japan, China and Taiwan;
C. apicipicta (Inoue, 1963), occurring in China, Japan and Korea;
C. aciculata Huang & Du, 2023, which is so far only known from the southern Chinese Hainan and Yunnan provinces.

References

Spilomelinae
Crambidae genera
Taxa named by William Warren (entomologist)